Paul Matthews Cleveland (born August 25, 1931) is an American diplomat who served as the United States Ambassador to New Zealand and Samoa from 1986 to 1989 and as the United States Ambassador to Malaysia from 1989 to 1992.

References

1931 births
Living people
Ambassadors of the United States to New Zealand
Ambassadors of the United States to Samoa
Ambassadors of the United States to Malaysia
United States Foreign Service personnel
20th-century American diplomats